Garden City is a village located on Long Island in Nassau County, New York. It is the Greater Garden City area's anchor community. The population was 23,272 at the 2020 census.

The Incorporated Village of Garden City is primarily located within the Town of Hempstead, with the exception being a small area at the northern tip of the village located within the Town of North Hempstead.

History

Early years
In 1869, Irish-born millionaire Alexander Turney Stewart bought a portion of the lightly populated Hempstead Plains. In a letter, Stewart described his intentions for Garden City:

The central attraction of the new community was the Garden City Hotel. It was replaced by a new hotel in 1895, designed by the acclaimed firm of McKim, Mead & White. This hotel was destroyed by fire in 1899 and then rebuilt and expanded, before being replaced again in 1983. The hotel still stands on the original grounds, as do many nearby Victorian homes. Access to Garden City was provided by the Central Railroad of Long Island, another Stewart project which he undertook at the same time. This railroad, in conjunction with the Flushing & North Side Railroad, ran from Long Island City through Garden City to Farmingdale (with a spur to the location of the Stewart's brickworks in Bethpage), and then to Babylon. It opened in 1873, with a branch to Hempstead.

Stewart's wife, Cornelia, founded the Cathedral Schools of St. Paul (for boys) and St. Mary (for girls),  a Bishop's Residence and the Gothic Cathedral of the Incarnation, which is today the center of the Episcopal Diocese of Long Island, as well as the final resting place of Alexander Turney Stewart and Cornelia Stewart. This elaborate memorial was completed in 1885. Mrs. Stewart died the following year. In 2008, the Cathedral of the Incarnation underwent a multimillion-dollar renovation and rehabilitation project, which was completed in 2012.

Voters selected Mineola (in the town of North Hempstead) to be the county seat for the new county of Nassau in November 1898 (before Mineola incorporated as a village in 1906 and set its boundaries), winning out over Hicksville and Hempstead. The Garden City Company (founded in 1893 by the heirs of Alexander Turney Stewart) donated  of land for the county buildings just south of the Mineola train station and the present-day Incorporated Village of Mineola, in the Town of Hempstead. The land and the buildings have a Mineola postal address but are within the present-day village of Garden City, which did not incorporate, or set its boundaries, until 1919. The early village did well due to its proximity to Hempstead, which was at that time the commercial center of Long Island. In time, thanks to the railroad and to automobiles, as well, Garden City's population increased.

In its early years, the press referred to Garden City as "Stewart's Folly" due to the lack of residents that Stewart had envisioned would populate his project.

20th century
In 1910, Doubleday, Page, and Co., one of the world's most important publishers, moved its operations to the east side of Franklin Avenue and had its own train station called Country Life Press added nearby. The Doubleday company purchased much of the land on the west side of Franklin Avenue, and built estate homes for many of its executives on Fourth Street. In 1916, company co-founder and Garden City resident Walter Hines Page was named Ambassador to Great Britain.

The area to the west of Garden City, named Garden City Estates, was established in 1907. It was merged with Garden City with both incorporated as the Village of Garden City in 1919. Garden City's growth promoted the development of many nearby towns, including Stewart Manor, Garden City Park, Garden City South and East Garden City.

The Village is home to three golf courses, the first having been laid out under the direction of Devereux Emmet in 1896, now called the Garden City Golf Club. Subsequently, the now-named Cherry Valley Club (originally Salisbury Club) and Garden City Country Club were opened. For a short time in the late 1920s a fourth course existed, the Old Westbury Golf Club (initially the Intercollegiate Golf Club), east of Clinton Road.

Aviation played a big role in the history of the Village. The Nassau Boulevard Aerodrome, west of the Estates section, hosted the Second International Aviation Meet in 1911, which featured the first official airmail service. Other airfields included the Washington Avenue Field and the Hempstead Aerodrome, which ultimately became Roosevelt Field before being replaced by the Roosevelt Field Mall in the 1950s.

In the 1920s, the community continued to grow, with houses built in Garden City Estates as well as the eastern section of Garden City. Housing construction slowed after the 1929 stock market crash. But in the 1930s, hundreds of houses were built to accommodate a population boom, though Garden City used a strict zoning code to preserve Stewart's vision. The Village retained a sense of orderly development, true to its rigorously planned roots.

Starting in the 1930s many branches of well-known New York City stores, including Best & Co., Saks Fifth Avenue, Bloomingdale's and Lord & Taylor, opened along Franklin Avenue; earning the name "Fifth Avenue of Long Island." All of these have subsequently closed due to relocation to nearby Roosevelt Field Mall or closure. The large buildings have been rebuilt as office space.

After World War II, following a trend of urban residents moving to the suburbs, Garden City continued to grow. Post-war construction filled out the present borders of Garden City with many split-level and ranch-style homes, with construction occurring in the town's far eastern, northern and western sections. The Waldorf School of Garden City was founded in 1947 (one of the first Waldorf schools in the United States), originally as a part of Adelphi University. The village's new public high school was also constructed in 1956, supplementing the original Cherry Valley school, which had opened in 1925.

The flat expanse of the land adjacent to Garden City allowed its use for military activities. For the Civil War Camp Winfield Scott existed, for the Spanish-American War of 1898 Camp Black was established, and for World War I in 1917 Camp Albert Mills occupied land in the southeast part of the Village. Although Camp Mills was decommissioned after the war, the airbase Mitchel Field, which was established at the same time east of the Village, existed until 1962.

In the 1960s, The World discotheque in Garden City featured multi-media supplied by USCO.

In the 1970s, the old Garden City Hotel declared bankruptcy and subsequently closed, and was ultimately demolished in 1973. A new Garden City Hotel was constructed on the site of the old Garden City Hotel. In 1978, fifty of the original structures collectively known as the A. T. Stewart Era Buildings were designated a national historic district and listed on the National Register of Historic Places.

In 1989, St. Paul's School also closed and in 1993 was purchased by the Village of Garden City, eventually designating St. Paul's and its property as "park land. St. Mary's School, the sister school of St. Paul's, was demolished in 2002. Since then, six large single-family houses have been built on the property.

Garden City has its own police department and volunteer fire department. Fire operations are conducted from three fire houses across the Village.

The Garden City Public Library, first established in 1952 as a volunteer service, now serves its residents from its building erected in 1973.

The Department of Recreation and Parks maintains many programs for Village residents, and operates the Community Pool in the Summer months. The Senior Center is used by all ages for meetings and recreational activities. In addition, this Commission is responsible for the maintenance of the trees located on streets and municipal property. One of the most important features of the Village is the prohibition of power lines on most streets, allowing the proper development of its street trees.

The Department of Public Works is responsible for the upkeep of the Village. Its equipment is maintained by its own staff at its municipal garage. It provides garbage and rubbish collection, water service, and street maintenance including snow plowing.

On December 7, 1993, the Long Island Rail Road's Merillon Avenue station, which is located within the village, was the location of the Long Island Rail Road massacre in which six people were murdered and 19 injured in a racially motivated mass shooting perpetrated by Colin Ferguson, a black Jamaican immigrant.

Garden City lost 23 residents during the attack on the World Trade Center on September 11, 2001. Every year on the anniversary of the attack, the Garden City Fire Department holds a remembrance ceremony. A bell tolls after the reading of each of the 23 residents’ names, which are etched in the memorial monument stone on the Village Green.

Geography

According to the U.S. Census Bureau, the village has a total area of 5.3 square miles (13.8 km2), all land. The village lost some territory between the 1990 census and the 2000 census.

Greater Garden City area
In addition to the Incorporated Village of Garden City, the Garden City 11530 ZIP code includes another incorporated village, Stewart Manor, as well as two unincorporated areas of the Town of Hempstead: Garden City South and East Garden City – the latter of which was absorbed by the CDP of Uniondale in the 2010s.

Demographics

As of the census of 2020, 23,272 people lived in Garden City. The population density was 4,059.5 inhabitants per square mile (1,567.0/km2). The town included 7,715 housing units at an average density of 1,415.2 per square mile (546.3/km2). The racial makeup of the village was 88.8% White, 1.1% African American, 0.0% Native American, 4.7% Asian, 0.00% Pacific Islander, 0.4% from other races, and 3.1% from two or more races. Hispanic or Latino of any race were 6.3% of the population.

Garden City included 7,338 households, out of which 25.5% had children under the age of 18 living with them, 69.8% were married couples living together, 7.5% had a female householder with no husband present, and 20.7% were non-families. 19.2% of all households were made up of individuals, and 12.0% had someone living alone who was 65 years of age or older. The average household size was 2.83 and the average family size was 3.27.

In the village, the population was spread out, with 26.5% under the age of 18, 4.7% from 20 to 24, 7.2% from 25 to 34, 42.6% over 45, 21.6% over 60 and 1.9% who were over the age of 85. The median age was 41 years. For every 100 females, there were 90.5 males. For every 100 females age 18 and over, there were 84.1 males.

As of the census of 2020, the median income for a household in the village was $186,607. The per capita income for the village was $83,823.

Government 

As of August 2022, the Mayor of Garden City is Cosmo Veneziale and the Village Trustees are Mary Carter Flanagan, Bruce Chester, Charles Kelly, Terry Digan, Bruce Torino, Lawrence Marciano Jr. and Tom O'Brien. The Village Administrator is Ralph V. Suozzi, the former Mayor of the City of Glen Cove and the cousin of Congressman Thomas R. Suozzi.

From its inception until 2021, the Mayor and Trustees were elected via a "Community Agreement" in which the four Property Owners’ Associations, representing different areas of the Village, held primary elections in January. Winners were entered on the official ballot in March as the “Community Agreement Party” without opposition.

Education

Public schools 
Garden City is mostly served by its own school district: the Garden City Union Free School District. As such, most students who reside within Garden City and attend public schools go to Garden City's schools.

Private schools 
One independent school, the Waldorf School of Garden City (grades pre-K–12), and two Roman Catholic elementary schools (K–8), St. Joseph School and St. Anne School, are in Garden City. The former St. Paul's School and St. Mary's School are now defunct.

Higher education 
In 1929, Adelphi College, which later became Adelphi University, moved from Brooklyn to its present  campus in Garden City, becoming the first four-year college in Nassau or Suffolk counties.

Infrastructure

Transportation

Road 

Clinton Road (Nassau County Route 1) traverses the village and is one of its major north–south thoroughfares. Old Country Road (Nassau County Route 25) forms much of Garden City's northern border. Other major roads within the village are Franklin Avenue, Rockaway Avenue, Nassau Boulevard, New Hyde Park Road, Stewart Avenue, and Washington Avenue.

Road layout
Much of Garden City's street network is laid out to resemble the traditional street grid. A major exception is the Mott Section, which features a series of parallel, semicircular streets and numerous north–south streets connecting the crescents.

Rail 

There are five Long Island Rail Road (LIRR) train stations in the village. The stops are Stewart Manor, Nassau Boulevard, Garden City and Country Life Press on the LIRR's Hempstead Branch and Merillon Avenue on the LIRR Main Line. There are additional stops on the LIRR Main Line just over the Garden City border at New Hyde Park and Mineola.

Bus 
Several bus lines traverse the village provided by Nassau Inter-County Express (NICE).

Utilities

Natural gas 
National Grid USA provides natural gas to homes and businesses that are hooked up to natural gas lines in Garden City.

Power 
PSEG Long Island provides power to all homes and businesses within Garden City.

Sewage 
Garden City is connected to sanitary sewers. The village maintains a sanitary sewer system which flows into Nassau County's system, which treats the sewage from the village's system through the Nassau County-owned sewage treatment plants.

Water 
The Village of Garden City owns and maintains its own water system. Garden City's water system serves the majority of the Village with water. The Water Authority of Western Nassau County services Village residents who live in the westernmost part of the Village.

Notable landmarks 

 Adelphi University
 Apostle Houses
 Cathedral of the Incarnation
 Garden City Hotel
 Garden City High School
 Theodore Roosevelt Executive and Legislative Building (old Nassau County Courthouse)
 St. Paul's School

Legacy 
Garden City inspired the names of several nearby municipalities (as stated above), and is the namesake of Garden Village, Kentucky.

Notable people 

 Madeleine Albright (1937-2022), diplomat, political scientist, and United States Secretary of State
 Herbert M. Allison, businessman
 Eddie Arcaro (1916–1997), jockey, and Triple Crown winner
 Joe Biden, 46th President of the United States
 Jason Blake, NHL All-Star
 Steven Chu, Secretary of Energy, Nobel Prize winner in physics
 Cliff Compton, former WWE Tag Team Champion and current Ring of Honor wrestler
 Bruce Coslet, former New York Jets head coach
 Matt Daley, New York Yankees pitcher
 Dave DeBusschere, NBA Hall of Famer
 Nelson DeMille, author
 Kent Desormeaux, jockey
 Mick Foley, professional wrestler
 John Gibson, journalist
 Kemp Hannon, New York state senator
 Liza Huber, soap opera actress, Passions
 Joe Iconis, musical theater writer
 Dave Jennings, former New York Giants punter
 Greg Kelly, television anchor
 Harvey J. Levin, pioneer of communications economics, holder of Long Island's first research chair, Hofstra University
 Susan Lucci, actress; grew up in Garden City, worked at the Garden City Hotel, and in 1978 moved back to Garden City
 Eric Mangini, former New York Jets coach
 Christopher Masterson, actor
 Danny Masterson, actor
 Kevin Mawae, former NFL Pro Bowl center and president of NFL Player's Association
 Kiaran McLaughlin, horse trainer
 Jennifer McLogan, TV news reporter
 Richard Migliore, horse jockey
 Alexandra Miller, Florida politician and businesswoman
 Joe Mohen, Internet entrepreneur
 Bill Moyers, journalist
 Elliott Murphy, singer-songwriter
 Joe Namath, former NFL quarterback
 Walter Hines Page, United States Ambassador to England during World War I, and co-founder of Doubleday, Page and Co. publishing
 Žigmund Pálffy, four-time NHL All-Star
 Mark Parrish, NHL All-Star
 Larry Pasquale, former special teams coach for the New York Jets
 Kash Patel, former chief-of-staff of the U.S. Secretary of Defense. 
 Ethan Phillips, television actor, Star Trek: Voyager
 Todd Pletcher, Award-winning thoroughbred horse trainer. 
 Denis Potvin, NHL All-Star
 Nicole Rajičová, Olympic figure skater representing Slovakia. 
 Kathleen Rice 4th District of New York Representative; grew up in Garden City on Nassau Boulevard 
 Telly Savalas, actor
 Leslie Segrete, Trading Spaces carpenter, designer
 Dennis Seidenberg, two-time Stanley Cup Champion
 Lara Spencer, TV host
 Mark Streit, NHL All-Star
 Johnny Sylvester (1915–1990) received as a seriously ill child a promise from Babe Ruth that Ruth would hit a home run in the 1926 World Series on his behalf.
 John Tesh, musician, news anchor
 William B. Turner, World War I hero, recipient of the Medal of Honor
 Chris Weidman, UFC fighter 
 Paul Zaloom, actor and puppeteer best known as Beakman on Beakman's World

In popular culture

 The film The Spirit of St. Louis (1957), starring James Stewart, features Charles Lindbergh's historical flight to Paris from Roosevelt Field in Garden City in 1927.  Its first few scenes occur at the Garden City Hotel, where Lindbergh had a room reserved (but did not use, contrary to the film's portrayal), and the press corps stayed who were covering the event spent the night prior to his flight; Lindbergh was up all night working on his plane the night before the flight, although he did have dinner and take a nap at the Garden City home of his friend, Gregory J. Brandewiede, at 105 Third Street. The opening shot of the film's first scene shows the hotel's front exterior and sign.  Subsequent scenes take place and were filmed at Roosevelt Field.
 Musician John Tesh's fourth album, released in 1989, is titled Garden City (Cyprus Records), an homage to his hometown, and includes a song with the same title.  The record company he created in 1995 and currently owns is Garden City Records.

Films
 Boiler Room (2000)
 Election (1999)
 Frankenstein Meets the Space Monster (1965)
 Santa Claus Conquers the Martians (1964)
 Storytelling (2001)
 Street of the Dead (2008)
 The Antics of Ann (1917)
 The Godfather (1972)
 The Judgment of Weeping Mary (2008)
 The Spirit of St. Louis (1957)

Notes

References

External links 

 
 Garden City Chamber of Commerce

 
Hempstead, New York
Villages in New York (state)
Villages in Nassau County, New York
Populated places established in 1869
1869 establishments in New York (state)